Uncial 0172 (in the Gregory-Aland numbering), is a Greek uncial manuscript of the New Testament, dated palaeographically to the 5th century.

Description 
The codex contains a small parts of the Epistle to the Romans 1:27-30,32-2:2, on one parchment leaf (14 cm by 11 cm). The text is written in one column per page, 19 lines per page, in uncial letters. 

The Greek text of this codex is a representative of the Alexandrian text-type. Aland placed it in Category II.

Currently it is dated by the INTF to the 5th century.

Facsimile of this fragment was published by M. Naldini ad Guglielmo Cavallo.

The codex currently is housed at the Laurentian Library (PSI 4) in Florence.

See also 

 List of New Testament uncials
 Textual criticism
 Biblical manuscript

References

Further reading 

 Pubblicazioni della Societa Italiana (Papiri Greci e Latini) 4, ed. G. Vitelli. 
 M. Naldini, Documenti dell’Antichita Cristiana, 2nd ed. (Florence, 1965).

External links 
 Biblioteca Medicea Laurenziana

Greek New Testament uncials
5th-century biblical manuscripts